Phlebia radiata, commonly known as the wrinkled crust, is a common species of crust fungus in the family Meruliaceae. It is widespread in the Northern Hemisphere. It grows as a wrinkled, orange to pinkish waxy crust on the decaying wood of coniferous and deciduous trees, in which it causes a white rot. The fungus was first described scientifically in 1821 by Elias Magnus Fries.

Description
The fruitbody of Phlebia radiata is resupinate—flattened against its substrate like a crust. It is wrinkled, orange to pinkish in color, and has a waxy texture. The soft texture of the flesh hardens when the fruitbody becomes old. The fungus is inedible.

In mass, the spores are white. Microscopic examination reveals additional spore details: they are smooth, allantoid (sausage-shaped) to elliptical, and inamyloid, measuring 3.5–7 by 1–3 µm.

Similar species include Botryobasidium vagum, Meruliporia incrassata, Piloderma bicolor, and Serpula lacrymans.

Habitat and distribution
Phlebia radiata is a saprophytic species, and causes a white rot in the wood it colonizes, fallen logs and branches of both coniferous and hardwood trees.

References

Fungi described in 1821
Fungi of Asia
Fungi of Europe
Fungi of North America
Inedible fungi
Meruliaceae
Taxa named by Elias Magnus Fries